

Ukraine
 Danylo Ihnatenko – Bordeaux – 2021–22
 Mykola Kukharevych – Troyes – 2021–
 Maksym Levytskyi – Saint-Étienne – 2000–01
 Ruslan Malinovskyi – Marseille – 2022–
 Pierre Pchenitchy – Marseille – 1951–52
 Serhiy Skachenko – Metz – 1999–2002
 Oleksandr Skotsen – Nice – 1948–50
 Eduard Sobol – Strasbourg – 2022–
 Pavel Yakovenko – Sochaux – 1992–94
 Yuriy Yakovenko – Ajaccio – 2013–14
 Aleksandr Zavarov – AS Nancy – 1990–92

United Kingdom
These players did play in Ligue 1, but due to a lack of information are listed here:
 Sydney Bazin – Sochaux – 1932–34
 Arthur Charles Finn – Cannes – 1935–36
 Russell – Valenciennes – 1935–36
 Springfield – Mulhouse – 1935–36
 Whitehouse – Valenciennes – 1935–36

United States
 Freddy Adu – Monaco – 2008–09
 Alejandro Bedoya – Nantes – 2013–16
 Carlos Bocanegra – Rennes, Saint-Étienne – 2008–11
 Charlie Davies – Sochaux – 2009–10
 Konrad de la Fuente – Marseille – 2021–
 Joe Gaetjens – RC Paris – 1951–52
 Nicholas Gioacchini – Montpellier – 2021–22
 Matt Miazga – Nantes – 2018–19
 Ilija Mitic – Marseille – 1969–70
Erik Palmer-Brown – Troyes – 2021–
 David Regis – Valenciennes, Strasbourg, Lens, Metz, Troyes – 1992–97, 1998–2003
 Jordan Siebatcheu – Reims, Rennes – 2014–16, 2018–20
 Greg Vanney – Bastia – 2001–05
 Timothy Weah – Paris SG, Lille – 2017–
 Quentin Westberg – Troyes – 2006–07

Uruguay
 Carlos Acevedo – AS Nancy – 1977–78
 Mauro Arambarri – Bordeaux – 2015–17
 Juan Pedro Ascery – Nice – 1972–81
 Santiago Bessonart – Troyes, Bordeaux, Béziers, Alès, Nîmes Olympique, Montpellier – 1954–56, 1957–59, 1961–63
 Edgar Borges – Lille – 1992–94
 Carlos Bueno – Paris SG – 2005–06
 Erick Cabaco – Nancy – 2016–17
 Wilmar Cabrera – Nice – 1986–87
 José Carrabelo – Montpellier – 1961–63
 Daniel Carreño – Lens – 1985–87
Edinson Cavani – Paris SG – 2013–20
 Javier Chevantón – Monaco – 2004–06
 Oscar Cobas – Monaco – 1961–62
 Pablo Correa – AS Nancy – 1996–97
 José Dalmao – Nantes – 1992–93
 Oratio Diaz – Red Star – 1932–33
 Juan Duarte – Rennes – 1972–74
 Horacio Finamore – Red Star – 1932–33, 1934–35
 Andrés Fleurquin – Rennes – 2002–03
 Enzo Francescoli – RC Paris, Marseille – 1986–89
 Mauro Goicoechea – Toulouse – 2015–17, 2018–20
 Nacho González – AS Monaco – 2007–08
 Walter Guglielmone – Ajaccio – 2002–03
 Adrián Gunino – Toulouse – 2010–11
 Carlos Javier Guttierez – Stade Français – 1949–50
 Jonathan Iglesias – Clermont – 2021–22
 Ramon Jose Irrigaray – Sochaux – 1938–39, 1945–46
 Eduardo Ithurbide – Sochaux – 1937–38
 Gary Kagelmacher – Valenciennes – 2013–14
 Luis La Paz – Marseille – 1949–50, 1952–53
 Juan Andrés Larré – Niort – 1987–88
 Pierino Lattuada – Bordeaux – 1972–77
 Damián Macaluso – AS Nancy – 2006–10
 Ildo Maneiro – Lyon – 1973–76
 Hugo Martinez – Sochaux – 1949–50, 1952–53
 Williams Martínez – Valenciennes – 2007–08
 Juan Mujica – Lille, Lens – 1973–78
 Sergio Panzardo – Caen – 1989–90
 Rubén Paz – RC Paris – 1986–87
 Pedro Pedrucci – Laval – 1984–85
 Diego Pérez – AS Monaco – 2004–10
 Facundo Píriz – Montpellier – 2017–19
 Ignacio Ramírez – Saint-Étienne – 2021–22
 Venancio Ramos – Lens – 1984–87
 Cristian Rodríguez – Paris SG – 2005–07
 Guillermo Daniel Rodríguez – Lens – 2005–06
 Sergio Rodríguez Viera – Stade Français – 1949–51
 Agustín Rogel – Toulouse – 2019–20
 Conrad Ross – Sochaux – 1934–35
 Adrian Sarkissian – AS Nancy – 2005–08
 Martín Satriano – Brest – 2021–22
 Gorki Silvetti – Toulouse FC (1937) – 1946–47
 José Suarez – Nice – 1967–68
 Mathías Suárez – Montpellier – 2018–20
 Rubén Umpiérrez – AS Nancy, RC Paris – 1978–85, 1986–89
 Gonzalo Vargas – AS Monaco, Sochaux – 2006–08

USSR
This player did play in Ligue 1, but due to a lack of information is listed here:
 Pavel Makarov – Nîmes Olympique – 1950–51

References and notes

Books

Club pages
AJ Auxerre former players
AJ Auxerre former players
Girondins de Bordeaux former players
Girondins de Bordeaux former players
Les ex-Tangos (joueurs), Stade Lavallois former players
Olympique Lyonnais former players
Olympique de Marseille former players
FC Metz former players
AS Monaco FC former players
Ils ont porté les couleurs de la Paillade... Montpellier HSC Former players
AS Nancy former players
FC Nantes former players
Paris SG former players
Red Star Former players
Red Star former players
Stade de Reims former players
Stade Rennais former players
CO Roubaix-Tourcoing former players
AS Saint-Étienne former players
Sporting Toulon Var former players

Others

stat2foot
footballenfrance
French Clubs' Players in European Cups 1955-1995, RSSSF
Finnish players abroad, RSSSF
Italian players abroad, RSSSF
Romanians who played in foreign championships
Swiss players in France, RSSSF
EURO 2008 CONNECTIONS: FRANCE, Stephen Byrne Bristol Rovers official site

References

Notes

France
 
Association football player non-biographical articles